Holt of the Secret Service (1941) was the 16th serial released by Columbia Pictures.

Plot
A murderous gang of counterfeiters has kidnapped John Severn (played by Ray Parsons), the U.S. government's best engraver. He is forced to engrave a set of counterfeit plates, to print phony money that is virtually undetectable from genuine currency. The United States Secret Service sends its toughest agent, Jack Holt (played by himself), and his female partner, Kay Drew (Evelyn Brent), after the gang. Holt poses as escaped tough guy, Nick Farrel. Masquerading as the bickering, tough-talking Mr. and Mrs. Farrel, Holt and Drew manage to infiltrate the ruthless gang of thugs. Holt locates Severn and instructs him to keep working but as slowly as possible, to give Holt time to find the head of the crime ring. Holt takes the set of counterfeit plates in hand, and much of the action has Holt keeping the plates away from the crooks. The scenes shift from the gang's hideout in a lost canyon to a gambling ship on the high seas, to a small island country where the gang hopes to escape U.S. extradition.

The head of the ring is gambler Lucky Arnold (John Ward), but he hides behind the facade of one of his loyal henchmen, Quist (Ted Adams), to shield himself from the Secret Service, and lets another one of his men, Ed Valden (Tristram Coffin), do most of his dirty work. The island nation has its own self-appointed dictator (Stanley Blystone), who is also trying to rub out our hero. During the 15 episodes, Holt endures numerous brushes with death, emerging from all of them virtually unscathed. Holt is so tough that, when he faces a firing squad and is asked if he wants a blindfold, he murmurs, "Forget it. This is the only thing in life I haven't seen!"

Cast
 Jack Holt as Jack Holt / Nick Farrel
 Evelyn Brent as Kay Drew - R49
 C. Montague Shaw as Chief John W. Malloy (as Montague Shaw)
 Tristram Coffin as Ed Valden [Chs. 1-10]
 John Ward as 'Lucky' Arnold
 Ted Adams as Quist
 Joe McGuinn as 'Crimp' Evans
 Edward Hearn as Agent Jim Layton
 Ray Parsons as John Severn - Engraver [Chs. 1-4]
 Jack Cheatham as Agent Frank [Chs. 3-5, 8-9, 15]

Chapter titles

 Chaotic Creek
 Ramparts of Revenge
 Illicit Wealth
 Menaced by Fate
 Exits to Terror
 Deadly Doom
 Out of the Past
 Escape to Peril
 Sealed in Silence
 Named to Die
 Ominous Warnings
 The Stolen Signal
 Prison of Jeopardy
 Afire Afloat
 Yielded Hostage

Production
Jack Holt, Columbia's star of longest standing, had argued with studio head Harry Cohn. Cohn demoted him from working in feature films to this lowbrow serial adventure. Actually, it wasn't so much of a demotion because he was still working with the same feature-film crew, under producer Larry Darmour. Holt had misgivings about working in a serial, but was convinced by co-star Evelyn Brent to see it through. She knew that Darmour was making the serial for an adult audience, by making it thrilling and logical but never impossible. Darmour was also careful to cast the film with character actors who were not familiar from Darmour's serials.

Reception
Holt of the Secret Service turned out to be exceptionally successful in theaters, with the Jack Holt name attracting fans of action and adventure. By the time it was released, Holt had left the studio behind and there were no sequels.

After the serial's copyright lapsed in 1969, Holt of the Secret Service became one of the very few Columbia cliffhangers available for modern appraisal. Authors and critics marveled at the film's breakneck pace and hectic, six-against-one fight scenes as staged by former comedy director James W. Horne. Thus Holt of the Secret Service became the poster child for Columbia serials until the advent of home video, when more of the Columbia serials went into circulation.

Notes

Sources
Cinefania.com
eMoviePoster.com

External links

 
 
 

1941 films
1940s English-language films
American black-and-white films
Columbia Pictures film serials
Films directed by James W. Horne
1941 crime films
Articles containing video clips
American crime films
Films with screenplays by George H. Plympton
1940s American films